Connecticut's 17th State Senate district elects one member of the Connecticut State Senate. It consists of the communities of Ansonia, Derby, Beacon Falls, Bethany, and parts of Hamden, Naugatuck, and Woodbridge. It has been represented by Jorge Cabrera since 2021.

Recent elections

2020

2018

2016

2014

2012

References

17